Simon Patrick Doyle (born 1966-11-09 in Queensland) is a former Australian 1500 m runner who came fourth in the 1990 Commonwealth Games in Auckland and twelfth in the World Championships' final in Tokyo. In 1990, Doyle won three Grand Prix meetings. In 1991, he set Australian records for 1500 m at 3:31.96 min and the Mile at 3:49.91 min. He missed the 1992 Summer Olympics due to injuries.

Doyle's mile record was broken in 2005 by Craig Mottram, while his 1500m record stood until Ryan Gregson exceeded it in 2010.

Achievements

References

 Profile

1966 births
Living people
Australian male middle-distance runners
Australian Institute of Sport track and field athletes
Athletes (track and field) at the 1990 Commonwealth Games
Athletes (track and field) at the 1994 Commonwealth Games
Universiade medalists in athletics (track and field)
Universiade bronze medalists for Australia
Medalists at the 1989 Summer Universiade
Commonwealth Games competitors for Australia